Hampnes Pursuivant of Arms Extraordinary was an office of arms in the sixteenth century. The office was named after Hampnes, now Hames, a village and castle near Calais. Sir Gilbert Dethick held the office from 1536 until 1540.

Offices of arms